Getxo Artea Rugby Taldea is a Spanish rugby union club. The club currently competes in the División de Honor de Rugby competition, the 1st level of Spanish club rugby. The club are based in the province of Biscay, in the autonomous community of Basque Country, northern Spain. Getxo Artea play in yellow and black

Honours

Male team
 Spanish championship
 Champions: 1993
 Spanish King's cup
 Champions: 1990, 1991, 1992 and 1997
 Runners-up: 1993, 1995 and 2005

Female team
 European Female Clubs' Cup
 Runners-up: 2009
 Spanish Queen's cup
 Champions: 2001 and 2008
 Runners-up: 2004

Season by season

32 seasons in División de Honor

Squad 2012–13

See also
 Rugby union in Spain

External links
 Official website
 Spanish Rugby website

Rugby union teams in the Basque Country (autonomous community)
Getxo
Sport in Biscay
1975 establishments in Spain
Rugby clubs established in 1975